Hartlepool United Football Club is an English association football club based in Hartlepool, County Durham who currently play in League Two, the fourth tier of the English football league system. Fred Priest, who led the team to second in the North Eastern League in the 1909–10 season, was elected as the club's first manager in August 1908. The club was managed by Cecil Potter when it was named as a founder member of the Football League Third Division North for the 1921–22 season, in which the team finished in 4th position. The club went throughout the period of 1940–43 without a manager due to the Second World War but appointed Fred Westgarth in August 1943. Under the management of Angus McLean, the club won promotion to Division Three from Division Four after finishing in third place in the 1967–68 season.

The 1990–91 season saw promotion gained under the management originally of Cyril Knowles and later Alan Murray. Mike Newell led the team to promotion to Division Two in the 2002–03, after the season had initially been started by Chris Turner and also included the caretakership of Colin West. After relegation to League Two in 2006, former Northern Ireland international Danny Wilson managed the team as they subsequently won promotion back to League One, finishing in second place. Wilson was sacked in December 2008, with the team in the bottom half of the table. Hartlepool were relegated from League One in 2012–13 under John Hughes. In 2016–17, Hartlepool were relegated to the National League (the fifth tier of English football) for the first time in its history under the leadership of caretaker manager Matthew Bates, following the dismissal of Dave Jones near the end of the season. After serious financial difficulties in 2018, the club would stabilise on and off the pitch in the following years. In late 2019, Dave Challinor was appointed as manager and would lead the club back to the Football League in his first full season via the play-offs, defeating Torquay United in the 2021 National League play-off Final.

Managers
As of 23 February 2023 Only professional, competitive matches are counted.

References

 
Hartlepool United